Alpha Wolf refer to:

 Alpha (ethology), about the leader of a group of animals
 Alpha Wolf (band), an Australian nu metalcore band formed in 2013
 Alpha Wolf (pickup truck), an upcoming American compact electric pickup truck